Jochmann is a German surname. Notable people with the surname include:

Georg Jochmann (1874–1915), German internist and bacteriologist
Hansi Jochmann (born 1953), German actress
Jakob Jochmann (born 1993), Austrian handball player
Werner Jochmann (1921–1994), German historian

German-language surnames